Noah's Arc: Jumping the Broom is a music soundtrack to the motion picture of the same name starring Darryl Stephens and Jensen Atwood. It was released on October 21, 2008, by Tommy Boy Records. The soundtrack features artists such as Michelle Williams, Bob Sinclar, Roy Young, Phoebe Snow, Patrik-Ian Polk, Nikki Jane and Adriana Evans.

Track listing
 "We Break the Dawn (Karmatronic Remix)" (Performed by Michelle Williams) - 4:02
 "Sandcastle Disco (Karmatronic Remix)" (Performed by Solange) - 7:51
 "The Idiot" (Performed by Fol Chen featuring Patrik-Ian Polk) - 2:45
 "World, Hold On (Children of the Sky)" (Performed by Bob Sinclar and Steve Edwards) - 3:20
 "Cable TV" (Performed by Fol Chen) - 3:02
 "Him and Not Me" (Performed by Patrik-Ian Polk) - 3:29
 "End of the World" (Performed by Matt Alber) - 3:19
 "Don't Call It Love" (Performed by Roy Young) - 3:09
 "Come Clean" (Performed by Phoebe Snow) - 4:01
 "I Love U" (Performed by Nikki Jane) - 3:56
 "Today Tomorrow" (Performed by Tje Austin) - 3:34
 "Spies" (Performed by Sy Smith) - 4:07
 "Eat Sushi" (Performed by Pam Jones) - 3:20
 "Something Real" (Performed by Phoebe Snow) - 3:38
 "Home to Me" (Performed by Patrik-Ian Polk) - 4:39

References

2008 soundtrack albums
Comedy film soundtracks
Drama film soundtracks